Callenish Circle was an extreme metal band from the Netherlands. They recorded three of their albums for Metal Blade Records, and broke up in February 2007. In the early 2000s things were going well for the band. In 2002 they toured with God Dethroned, played at the Dutch version of Ozzfest and the German Party San Open Air, and opened for Dimmu Borgir. Their fourth album was released by Metal Blade in 2003; to support it they played that year's Wacken Open Air and Summer Breeze festivals in Germany, and in October they were part of the Bonded By Metal Over Europe-tour, headlined by Exodus, Nuclear Assault, and Agent Steel. In 2006 they toured Mexico (cited by the band as the high point of their career), before they decided to break up in 2007.

A part of their song “Suffer My Disbelief” is used as an outro in the online review show Angry Joe Show.

Discography
 Lovelorn (Demo, 1995)
 Drift of Empathy (Album, Hammerheart, 1996)
 Escape (EP, Polar Bear, 1998)
 Graceful... Yet Forbidding (Album, DSFA (Benelux)/Edgerunner, 1999/2001)
 Flesh Power Dominion (Album, Metal Blade, 2002)
 My Passion // Your Pain (Album, Metal Blade, 2003)
 Forbidden Empathy (2CD, 2005)
 [Pitch.Black.Effects] (Album, Metal Blade, 2005/2006)

Members

Final line-up
 Wim Vossen − bass
 Remy Dieteren − guitar
 Gavin Harte − drums
 Ronny Tijssen − guitar
 Patrick Savelkoul − vocals

Past members
 Jos Evers − guitar (1992–1998)
 Maurice Wagemans − bass (1992–1995)
 John Gorissen − bass (1995–1997)
 Roland Schuschke − bass (1997–2002)
 René Rokx − bass (2002–2005)

References

External links
 Callenish Circle official website
 Callenish Circle at MySpace
 

Dutch melodic death metal musical groups
Dutch black metal musical groups
Blackened death metal musical groups
Dutch death metal musical groups
Musical groups established in 1992
Musical groups disestablished in 2007
Musical quintets
Metal Blade Records artists